Kaiserstuhl AG railway station is a railway station in the Swiss canton of Aargau and municipality of Kaiserstuhl. The station is located on the Winterthur to Koblenz line of Swiss Federal Railways and is served by Zurich S-Bahn line S36. The ZVV busline 515 connects Kaiserstuhl with Bülach as well.

Services
 the following services stop at Kaiserstuhl AG:

References

External links
 
 

Railway stations in the canton of Aargau
Swiss Federal Railways stations